Samwé (samoe), also known as Wara (ouara, ouala), is a Gur language of Burkina. Dialects are Negueni-Klani, Ouatourou-Niasogoni, and Soulani. Niasogoni speakers have difficulty with Negueni, but not vice versa.

References

Wara–Natyoro languages
Languages of Burkina Faso